Systellantha is a genus of flowering plants belonging to the family Primulaceae.

Its native range is Borneo.

Species:

Systellantha brookeae 
Systellantha fruticosa 
Systellantha serratifolia

References

Primulaceae
Primulaceae genera